Musanze is a district in the Northern Province of Rwanda. Its capital city is Ruhengeri.

Geography and tourism 
Musanze is Rwanda's most mountainous district, containing the largest part of the Volcanoes National Park, and its head office at Kinigi. Five of the eight volcanoes of the Virunga chain (Karisimbi, Bisoke, Sabyinyo, Gahinga and Muhabura) are within the district boundaries. It is also in this district that most of Rwanda's mountain gorillas are found, making it the most popular tourist destination in the country.

Sectors 
Musanze district is divided into 15 sectors (imirenge): Busogo, Cyuve, Gacaca, Gashaki, Gataraga, Kimonyi, Kinigi, Muhoza, Muko, Musanze, Nkotsi, Nyange, Remera, Rwaza and Shingiro. But Musanze district is not entirely covering the whole area of former Ruhengeri province.  68 cells, and 432 umudugudus/villages,  with a population of 398,986.

Weather and Climate History for Musanze 
Musanze is situated closer to the equator, making summers hard to define.
In Musanze the average annual temperature is 15.9 C | 60.6 F. In winter there's

much less rainfall than in summer.

Irish Potatoes plantation 

Irish potatoes are mainly grown in Burera, Musanze, Nyabihu and Rubavu districts and this program is expected to harmonize the Irish potato trading locally and turn it into export-oriented business

References 

 
 Inzego.doc — Province, District and Sector information from MINALOC, the Rwanda ministry of local government.

Districts of Rwanda
Tourism by city
District in Northern province of Rwanda